The Bread Peddler (French:La porteuse de pain) is an 1884 novel by the French writer Xavier de Montépin. It has been turned into a number of films and television adaptations.

Films
, directed by Romolo Bacchini (1911)
The Bread Peddler, directed by Giovanni Enrico Vidali (1916)
The Bread Peddler, directed by René Le Somptier (1923)
The Bread Peddler, directed by Maurice Cloche (1950)
The Bread Peddler, directed by Maurice Cloche (1963)
The Bread Seller Woman, directed by Zafer Davutoğlu (Turkey, 1965)

Television Series
, directed by Marcel Camus (1973)

References

Bibliography
 Goble, Alan. The Complete Index to Literary Sources in Film. Walter de Gruyter, 1999.

1884 French novels
Novels set in France
French novels adapted into films